The Hawzen massacre was a massacre committed by Derg Forces on 22 June 1988. on that day Ethiopian Mig and helicopter gunships bombed the market in Hawzen, Tigray killing 2,500 civilians after receiving intentionally wrong TPLG rebel movement info from TPLF.

Four ancient stele were toppled in the same bombardment.

See also
Asmara massacres
Hawzen in the Tigray War

References

Massacres in 1988
Airstrikes in Africa
June 1988 events in Africa
Marketplace attacks in Africa
June 1988 crimes
20th-century mass murder in Africa
massacre
Massacres in Ethiopia
Ethiopian Civil War